Jonathan Niva (16 May 1942 – 12 May 2001) was a Kenyan international footballer who played as a defender. He made 88 appearances for the Kenya national football team, scoring twice. He had a spell as player-manager of the Kenya national football team in 1972. He retired as a player in 1978. He is the grandfather of Rwandan footballer Yves Rubasha.

References

1942 births
2001 deaths
Kenyan footballers
Association football defenders
People from Kakamega County
Kenya international footballers
Kenya national football team managers
1972 African Cup of Nations players
A.F.C. Leopards players
Gor Mahia F.C. players
A.F.C. Leopards managers